

Bridges
The bridges include road bridges, railway bridges, rail-cum-road bridges and barrage-cum-bridges.

Flyovers

References 

Bridges in West Bengal
West Bengal